Damarea Crockett (born December 22, 1997) is an American football running back for the Denver Broncos of the National Football League (NFL). He played college football at Missouri, and was originally signed by the Houston Texans as an undrafted free agent in 2019. He has also been a member of the Oakland Raiders and Green Bay Packers.

Early years
Crockett attended Little Rock Christian Academy in Little Rock, Arkansas. As a senior, he rushed for 1,475 yards and 22 touchdowns on 227 carries. He led the Warriors to a home field advantage playoff run that would eventually be ended into the semi-finals to their instate rivals Pulaski Academy. Crockett initially committed to play college football at Boise State University. However, he eventually flipped his commitment to the University of Missouri.

College career
In 2016, as a freshman, Crockett played in 11 of Missouri's 12 games, and set Missouri freshman records for rushing yards in a season (1,062), rushing touchdowns in a season (ten), and rushing yards in a single game (225). He was suspended for the Missouri's last game of the season after he was arrested for possession of marijuana.

As a sophomore in 2017, Crockett started the year as Missouri's starting running back before a shoulder injury ended his season after six games. In those six games, he had rushed for 481 yards and two touchdowns on eighty carries.

In 2018, as a junior, Crockett returned healthy and played in Missouri's first 11 games before missing the last two due to toe and ankle injuries. He rushed for 709 yards and seven touchdowns on 147 carries.

After the season, Crockett declared for the 2019 NFL Draft.

Professional career

Houston Texans
Crockett signed with the Houston Texans as an undrafted free agent following the 2019 draft. The Texans waived him on August 31 during final roster cuts.

Oakland Raiders
On September 2, 2019, Crockett was signed to the Oakland Raiders practice squad. He was released on October 14.

Green Bay Packers
On October 16, 2019, Crockett was signed to the Green Bay Packers practice squad. He signed a reserve/future contract with the Packers on January 21, 2020.

Crockett was waived on September 5, 2020, and was signed to the practice squad the following day. He was released on September 10.

Denver Broncos
On October 22, 2020, Crockett was signed to the Denver Broncos practice squad. He signed a reserve/future contract on January 4, 2021.

On August 31, 2021, Crockett was waived by the Broncos and re-signed to the practice squad the next day. He was promoted to the active roster on September 22, 2021. He was waived on October 26, and re-signed to the practice squad. He was promoted to the active roster on December 4. He was waived on December 21 and re-signed to the practice squad. He signed a reserve/future contract with the Broncos on January 10, 2022.

On August 2, 2022, Crockett went down with a torn ACL during a training camp practice, alongside Tim Patrick, ending both of their seasons prematurely.  He was placed on injured reserve on August 3, 2022.

References

External links

Denver Broncos bio
Missouri Tigers bio

1997 births
Living people
Sportspeople from Little Rock, Arkansas
Players of American football from Arkansas
American football running backs
Missouri Tigers football players
Houston Texans players
Oakland Raiders players
Green Bay Packers players
Denver Broncos players